Blotter may refer to:

 Blotter (album), a 1996 album by the American band Nightstick
 Blotter acid, a means of transporting and taking LSD and other psychedelic compounds
 Blotting paper, used to absorb ink or oil from writing materials, particularly when quill or fountain pens were popular
 Blotter, a 1993 painting by American artist Peter Doig
 "Blotter", the fourth track of the album Stone Sour by the band of that same name
 Baby Blotter, a character from Bear in the Big Blue House
 Police blotter, a daily record of arrests and other events at a police station
 Desk pad, a table or desk protector

See also 
 Blottr, a UK-based citizen journalism news website
 
 Bloater (disambiguation)
 Blot (disambiguation)
 Blott (disambiguation)